Paul Jibson (born 19 August 1982) is an English actor, director and producer.

Background 
Jibson was born on 19 August 1982 in Kingston upon Hull, Humberside. He is the brother of actor Michael Jibson.

He made his West End debut at the age of 12 in Oliver! at the London Palladium, which was directed by Sam Mendes. He later trained at the Guildford School of Acting.

Television work
Jibson's television work includes All About George and Heartbeat for ITV, Dalziel and Pascoe, Holby City and the role of Adam Sheffield in Doctors for the BBC. EastEnders in September 2010. and Casualty in 2013.

Film work
Jibson's film work as an actor includes the short films No Drinks Allowed, written and directed by Adam Horton and Joe Horton, Noel Clarke's, Hammered, directed by Steve Lewis and Bloodycuts 'Death Scenes'. He also played the role of Yngvarr in Chris Crow's Viking saga 'The Darkest Day'

Jibson's first short film as writer, director and producer was Winter Sun starring Scarlett Alice Johnson and David Ajala, which was part of the official selection of the 2011 London Independent Film Festival.

In 2017, he produced the award-winning short film THE ENERGY WITHIN, with Manon Ardisson (Gods Own Country) starring British paralympian Stef Reid.

References

External links 

1982 births
Living people
21st-century English male actors
Male actors from Kingston upon Hull